Edgecombe Agricultural Works is a historic factory building located at Tarboro, Edgecombe County, North Carolina. It was built in 1872, and is a long, low gable roof brick structure. It is of heavy timber frame construction and features parapetted, stepped gable ends.  The Edgecombe Agricultural Works and later Edgecombe Machine Shop continued to manufacture and repair farm implements to the early 20th century.

It was listed on the National Register of Historic Places in 1980.

References

Industrial buildings and structures on the National Register of Historic Places in North Carolina
Industrial buildings completed in 1872
Buildings and structures in Edgecombe County, North Carolina
National Register of Historic Places in Edgecombe County, North Carolina
1872 establishments in North Carolina